Kaun Jeeta Kaun Haara is a 1987 Hindi drama film directed and produced by Rakesh Kumar. The film features Aruna Irani, Kishore Kumar and Amrish Puri as main characters.

Cast 
Kishore Kumar
Aruna Irani
Madhu Kapoor
Amrish Puri
Siraj Khan
Amitabh Bachchan... Himself (Guest Appearance)
Dinesh Hingoo
Pinchoo Kapoor
Jagdeep
Shobha Khote
Vikas Anand
Aruna Irani
Mohan Sherry

Music 

The music of the film was composed by Usha Khanna and the lyrics were penned by Kulwant Jani.

References

External links 

1980s Hindi-language films
1987 films
Films scored by Usha Khanna